The 1974 Washington Huskies football team was an American football team that represented the University of Washington during the 1974 NCAA Division I football season.  In its 18th and final season under head coach  the team compiled a 5–6 record, finished in a tie for fifth place in the Pacific-8 Conference, and was outscored by its opponents by a combined total 

Linebacker Cornelius Chenevert was selected as the team's most valuable player, and the team captains were Willie Hendricks, Bob Martin, Dave Pear, and Ray Pinney. Days after the season concluded with an Apple Cup victory at  47-year-old Owens stepped down as   succeeded him

Schedule

Roster

NFL Draft selections
Three University of Washington Huskies were selected in the 1975 NFL Draft, which lasted seventeen rounds with 442 selections.

References

Washington
Washington Huskies football seasons
Washington Huskies football